Fred G. Gurley (1889 – July 4, 1976) was president and executive committee chairman of Atchison, Topeka and Santa Fe Railway.

Gurley began his railroad career in 1906 on the Chicago, Burlington and Quincy Railroad, where he worked his way up to become an assistant vice president. In 1939 he transferred to the Santa Fe as a vice president; he was elected president and executive committee chairman of the Santa Fe in 1944. On July 17, 1955, Gurley appeared on Dateline: Disneyland; the special broadcast of the opening of Disneyland. Gurley, along with Walt Disney and California Governor Goodwin Knight operated the inaugural running of the Disneyland Railroad; advertised at the time as the Santa Fe & Disneyland Railroad. At that time, he was named an honorary director for life by the railroad.

Legacy
 Engine No. 3 of the Disneyland Railroad is named "Fred Gurley", it began service there on March 28, 1958.

References 
 

1889 births
1976 deaths
20th-century American railroad executives
Atchison, Topeka and Santa Fe Railway presidents